Myrrhinium is a genus of plants in the Myrtaceae first described as a genus in 1827. It contains only one recognized species, Myrrhinium atropurpureum, native to South America (Colombia, Ecuador, Peru, S + SE Brazil, Uruguay, N Argentina).

Varieties
 Myrrhinium atropurpureum var. atropurpureum - SE Brazil
 Myrrhinium atropurpureum var. octandrum Benth. - (Colombia, Ecuador, Peru, S Brazil, Uruguay, N Argentina

References

Myrtaceae
Flora of South America
Monotypic Myrtaceae genera